The Heart's Desire is a Big Finish Productions audio drama featuring Lisa Bowerman as Bernice Summerfield, a character from the spin-off media based on the long-running British science fiction television series Doctor Who.

Plot 
Bernice visits Marlowe's World to try and stop a pulsar that threatens to destroy the Braxiatel Collection. There she meets some ancient beings who can grant her every wish.

Cast
Bernice Summerfield - Lisa Bowerman
Topsy Turve - Lucy Beresford
Hardy - Conrad Westmaas
Barron - Steven Bugdale

Trivia
This story features the Eternals from the Doctor Who adventure Enlightenment.

External links
Big Finish Productions - Professor Bernice Summerfield: The Heart's Desire

Bernice Summerfield audio plays
Fiction set in the 27th century